Frederick Chilton (born 10 July 1935) was an English professional footballer who played as a full-back for Sunderland.

References

1935 births
Living people
People from Washington, Tyne and Wear
Footballers from Tyne and Wear
English footballers
Association football fullbacks
Sunderland A.F.C. players
North Shields F.C. players
English Football League players